Triplophysa is a genus of fish in the family Nemacheilidae found mainly in and around the Qinghai-Tibet Plateau in China. Currently, the genus is a mixed assemblage of species. Some lineages have been identified and treated as subgenera (Hedinichthys, Indotriplophysa, Labiatophysa, Qinghaichthys and Tarimichthys), but as Wikipedia follows Fishbase for fish species all but Hedinichthys have been treated as subgenera in Wikipedia, although Kottelat in his revision of the loaches did recognise them as valid. FishBase, however, includes these in Triplophysa without specifying subgenera and treats the names given by Kottelat as synonyms.

Ecology
Triplophysa dalaica has been used as model species to study adaptation to high-altitude hypoxia and 13 positively selected genes involved in hypoxia response have been identified. Some species are blind cave-dwellers.

Species
There are currently 132 recognized species in this genus:
 Subgenus Triplophysa Rendahl, 1933
 Triplophysa alexandrae Prokofiev, 2001
 Triplophysa aliensis (Y. F. Wu & S. Q. Zhu, 1979)
 Triplophysa altipinnis Prokofiev, 2003
 Triplophysa aluensis W. X. Li & Z. G. Zhu, 2000
 Triplophysa angeli (P. W. Fang, 1941)
 Triplophysa anshuiensis T. J. Wu, M. U. Wei, J. H. Lan & L. N. Du, 2018
 Triplophysa anterodorsalis S. Q. Zhu & W. X. Cao, 1989
 Triplophysa aquaecaeruleae Prokofiev, 2001
 Triplophysa arnoldii Prokofiev, 2006
 Triplophysa bashanensis T. Q. Xu & K. F. Wang, 2009
 Triplophysa bellibarus (T. L. Tchang, T. H. Yueh & H. C. Hwang, 1963)
 Triplophysa bleekeri (Sauvage & Dabry de Thiersant, 1874)
 Triplophysa brachyptera (Herzenstein, 1888)
 Triplophysa brahui (Zugmayer, 1912)
 Triplophysa brevibarba R. H. Ding, 1993
 Triplophysa brevicauda (Herzenstein, 1888)
 Triplophysa cakaensis W. X. Cao & S. Q. Zhu, 1988
 Triplophysa chandagaitensis Prokofiev, 2002
 Triplophysa chondrostoma (Herzenstein, 1888)
 Triplophysa coniptera (Turdakov, 1954)
 Triplophysa crassilabris R. H. Ding, 1994
 Triplophysa cuneicephala (T. H. Shaw & T. L. Tchang, 1931)
 Triplophysa dalaica (Kessler, 1876)
 Triplophysa daochengensis Y. Y. Wu, Z. Y. Sun & Y. S. Guo, 2016 
 Triplophysa daqiaoensis R. H. Ding, 1993
 Triplophysa daryoae Sheraliev, Kayumova & Peng, 2022 (Sokh stone loach)
 Triplophysa dongganensis J. Yang, 2013 
 Triplophysa dorsalis (Kessler, 1872) (grey stoneloach)
 Triplophysa dorsonotata (Kessler, 1879)
 Triplophysa farwelli (Hora, 1935)
 Triplophysa fengshanensis J. H. Lan, 2013 
 Triplophysa ferganaensis Sheraliev & Peng, 2021 (Fergana stone loach)
 Triplophysa flavicorpus J. X. Yang, X. Y. Chen & J. H. Lan, 2004
 Triplophysa furva S. Q. Zhu, 1992
 Triplophysa fuxianensis J. X. Yang & X. L. Chu, 1990
 Triplophysa gejiuensis (X. L. Chu & Y. R. Chen, 1979)
 Triplophysa gerzeensis W. X. Cao & S. Q. Zhu, 1988
 Triplophysa gracilis (F. Day, 1877)
 Triplophysa grahami (Regan, 1906)
 Triplophysa griffithii (Günther, 1868)
 Triplophysa gundriseri Prokofiev, 2002
 Triplophysa hexiensis (T. Q. Zhao & X. T. Wang, 1988)
 Triplophysa heyangensis S. Q. Zhu, 1992
 Triplophysa hialmari Prokofiev, 2001
 Triplophysa hsutschouensis (Rendahl), 1933)
 Triplophysa huanglongensis Gao, 1992
 Triplophysa huanjiangensis J. Yang, T. J. Wu & J. H. Lan, 2011
 Triplophysa huapingensis L. P. Zheng, J. X. Yang & X. Y. Chen, 2012 
 Triplophysa hutjertjuensis (Rendahl, 1933)
 Triplophysa incipiens (Herzenstein, 1888)
 Triplophysa intermedia (Kessler, 1876)
 Triplophysa jianchuanensis L. P. Zheng, L. N. Du, X. Y. Chen & J. X. Yang, 2010 (Jianchuan stone loach)
 Triplophysa jiarongensis Y. Lin, C. Li & J. K. Song, 2012 
 Triplophysa kafirnigani (Turdakov, 1948)
 Triplophysa kashmirensis (Hora, 1922) 
 Triplophysa kaznakowi Prokofiev, 2004
 Triplophysa kullmanni Bănărescu, Nalbant & Ladiges, 1975
 Triplophysa kungessana (Kessler, 1879)
 Triplophysa labiata (Kessler, 1874) (Plain thick-lip loach)
 Triplophysa lacusnigri (Berg, 1928)
 Triplophysa lacustris J. X. Yang & X. L. Chu, 1990
 Triplophysa langpingensis J. Yang, 2013 
 Triplophysa laterimaculata J. L. Li, N. F. Liu & J. X. Yang, 2007
 Triplophysa laticeps W. Zhou & G. H. Cui, 1997
 Triplophysa leptosoma (Herzenstein, 1888) 
 Triplophysa lihuensis T. J. Wu, J. Yang & J. H. Lan, 2012 
 Triplophysa lixianensis C. L. He, Z. B. Song & E. Zhang, 2008
 Triplophysa longianguis Y. F. Wu & C. Z. Wu, 1984
 Triplophysa longibarbata (Y. R. Chen, J. X. Yang, Sket & Aljančič, 1998)
 Triplophysa longipectoralis L. P. Zheng, L. N. Du, X. Y. Chen & J. X. Yang, 2009
 Triplophysa longliensis Q. Ren, J. X. Yang & X. Y. Chen, 2012 
 Triplophysa macrocephala J. Yang, T. J. Wu & J. X. Yang, 2012 
 Triplophysa macromaculata J. X. Yang, 1990
 Triplophysa macrophthalma S. Q. Zhu & Q. Z. Guo, 1985
 Triplophysa markehenensis (S. Q. Zhu & Y. F. Wu, 1981)
 Triplophysa marmorata (Heckel, 1838)  (Kashmir loach)
 Triplophysa microphysa (P. W. Fang, 1935)
 Triplophysa microps (Steindachner, 1866)
 Triplophysa minuta (S. C. Li, 1966)
 Triplophysa moquensis R. H. Ding, 1994
 Triplophysa nandanensis J. H. Lan, J. X. Yang & Y. R. Chen, 1995
 Triplophysa nanpanjiangensis (S. Q. Zhu & W. X. Cao, 1988)
 Triplophysa nasobarbatula D. Z. Wang & D. J. Li, 2001
 Triplophysa ninglangensis Y. F. Wu & C. Z. Wu, 1988
 Triplophysa nujiangensa X. Y. Chen, G. H. Cui & J. X. Yang], 2004
 Triplophysa obscura X. T. Wang, 1987
 Triplophysa obtusirostra Y. F. Wu & C. Z. Wu, 1988
 Triplophysa orientalis (Herzenstein, 1888)
 Triplophysa papillosolabiata (Kessler, 1879)
 Triplophysa pappenheimi (P. W. Fang, 1935)
 Triplophysa paradoxa (Turdakov, 1955) (Talas stone loach)
 Triplophysa parvus Z. M. Chen, W. X. Li & J. X. Yang, 2009
 Triplophysa polyfasciata R. H. Ding, 1996
 Triplophysa pseudoscleroptera (S. Q. Zhu & Y. F. Wu, 1981)
 Triplophysa pseudostenura C. L. He, E. Zhang & Z. B. Song, 2012 
 Triplophysa qilianensis W. J. Li, X. C. Chen & Y. P. Hu, 2015 
 Triplophysa qiubeiensis W. X. Li & H. F. Yang, 2008
 Triplophysa robusta (Kessler, 1876)
 Triplophysa rosa X. Y. Chen & J. X. Yang, 2005 
 Triplophysa scapanognatha Prokofiev, 2007
 Triplophysa scleroptera (Herzenstein, 1888)
 Triplophysa sellaefer (Nichols, 1925)
 Triplophysa sewerzowi (G. V. Nikolskii, 1938) (Severtsov’s loach)
 Triplophysa shaanxiensis J. X. Chen, 1987
 Triplophysa shilinensis Y. R. Chen & J. X. Yang, 1992
 Triplophysa shiyangensis (T. Q. Zhao & X. T. Wang, 1983)
 Triplophysa siluroides (Herzenstein, 1888)
 Triplophysa stenura (Herzenstein, 1888)
 Triplophysa stewarti (Hora, 1922)
 Triplophysa stolickai (Steindachner, 1866) (Tibetan stone loach) 
 Triplophysa strauchii (Kessler, 1874) (Spotted thick-lip loach)
 Triplophysa tanggulaensis S. Q. Zhu, 1982)
 Triplophysa tenuicauda (Steindachner, 1866)
 Triplophysa tenuis (F. Day, 1877)
 Triplophysa tianeensis X. Y. Chen, G. H. Cui & J. X. Yang, 2004
 Triplophysa tianxingensis H. F. Yang, W. X. Li & Z. M. Chen, 2016 
 Triplophysa tibetana (Regan, 1905)
 Triplophysa turpanensis Y. F. Wu & C. Z. Wu, 1992
 Triplophysa ulacholica (V. P. Anikin, 1905) (Issyk-kul naked loach)
 Triplophysa uranoscopus (Kessler, 1872)
 Triplophysa venusta S. Q. Zhu & W. X. Cao, 1988
 Triplophysa waisihani L. Cao & E. Zhang, 2008
 Triplophysa wulongensis Chen, Sheraliev, Shu & Peng, 2021
 Triplophysa wuweiensis (S. C. Li & S. Y. Chang, 1974)
 Triplophysa xiangshuingensis W. X. Li, 2004
 Triplophysa xiangxiensis (G. Y. Yang, F. X. Yuan & Y. M. Liao, 1986)
 Triplophysa xichouensis Liu, Pan, Yang & Chen, 2017
 Triplophysa xichangensis S. Q. Zhu & W. X. Cao, 1989
 Triplophysa xingshanensis (G. R. Yang & C. X. Xie, 1983)
 Triplophysa xiqiensis R. H. Ding & Q. Lai, 1996
 Triplophysa yajiangensis S. L. Yan, Z. Y. Sun & Y. S. Guo, 2015 
 Triplophysa yaopeizhii T. Q. Xu, C. G. Zhang & B. Cai, 1995
 Triplophysa yunnanensis J. X. Yang, 1990
 Triplophysa zhaoi Prokofiev, 2006
 Triplophysa zhenfengensis D. Z. Wang & D. J. Li, 2001
 Subgenus Indotriplophysa Prokofiev, 2010
 Triplophysa choprai (Hora, 1934) (snow loach)
 Triplophysa crassicauda (Herzenstein, 1888)
 Triplophysa eugeniae (Prokofiev, 2002)
 Triplophysa yasinensis (Alcock, 1898)
 Subgenus Labiatophysa Prokofiev, 2010
 Triplophysa herzensteini (Berg, 1909)
 Triplophysa microphthalma (Kessler, 1879)
 Triplophysa nasalis (Kessler, 1876)
 Subgenus Qinghaichthys S. Q. Zhu, 1981
 Triplophysa alticeps (Herzenstein, 1888)
 Triplophysa rotundiventris (Y. F. Wu]] & Yuan Chen, 1979)
 Triplophysas zaidamensis (Kessler, 1874)
 Triplophysa zamegacephala (T. Q. Zhao, 1985)
 Subgenus Tarimichthys Prokofiev, 2010
 Triplophysa bombifrons (Herzenstein, 1888)
 Triplophysa edsinica Prokofiev, 2003

References

 
Nemacheilidae
Freshwater fish of Asia
Taxonomy articles created by Polbot